Marwar Mathania railway station is a railway station in Jodhpur district, Rajasthan. Its code is MMY. It serves Mathania village. The station consists of a single platform. Passenger, Express and Superfast trains halt here.

References

Railway stations in Jodhpur district
Jodhpur railway division